Gholam A. Peyman (born 1 January 1937) is an ophthalmologist, retina surgeon, and inventor. He is best known for his invention of LASIK eye surgery, a vision correction procedure designed to allow people to see clearly without glasses. He was awarded the first US patent for the procedure in 1989.

Life and career
Peyman was born in Shiraz, Iran. At the age of 19, he moved to Germany to begin his medical studies. He received his MD at the University of Freiburg in 1962. He completed his internship at St. Johannes Hospital in Duisburg, Germany in 1964 and at Passaic General Hospital in Passaic, New Jersey in 1965. Peyman completed his residency in ophthalmology and a retina fellowship at the University of Essen, Essen Germany, in 1969 and an additional postdoctoral fellowship in retina at the Jules Stein Eye Institute, UCLA School of Medicine in Los Angeles in 1971. Peyman held the position of assistant professor of ophthalmology at the UCLA School of Medicine from 1971 and served as associate professor and then professor of ophthalmology and ocular oncology at the Illinois Eye and Ear Infirmary, University of Illinois at Chicago during 1971-1987.

Peyman held a joint appointment at the School of Medicine and also at the Neuroscience Center of Excellence at the Louisiana State University Medical University Medical Center in New Orleans during 1987-2000. During 1998-2000 Peyman held the Prince Abdul Aziz Bin Ahmed Bin Abdul Aziz Al Saud Chair in Retinal Diseases. During 2000-2006, Peyman served as professor of ophthalmology, ocular oncology and co-director, Vitreo-Retinal Service, Tulane University School of Medicine in New Orleans.

During 2006-2007 he was professor of ophthalmology at the University of Arizona, Tucson, with a cross appointment at University of Arizona College of Optical Sciences. He has been emeritus professor of ophthalmology at Tulane University since 2009.

Peyman is currently professor of basic medical sciences at the University of Arizona College of Medicine – Phoenix & Optical engineering at the University of Arizona in Tucson.
Peyman was awarded in 2013 an honoree doctorate degree from the National University of Cordoba in Argentina.

The Invention of LASIK surgery and its improvements
At the Illinois Eye and Ear Infirmary, Peyman, because of his interest in the effects of lasers on tissues in the eye, began evaluating the potential use of a  laser to modify corneal refraction in rabbits. No prior study had existed on this concept. The laser was applied to the surface of the cornea using different patterns. This laser created significant scarring. His conclusions at that time were: 1) one has to wait for the development of an ablative laser and 2) one should not ablate the surface of the cornea but, instead, the ablation should take place under a flap in order to prevent scarring, pain and other undesirable sequelae. Peyman published the first article on this subject in 1980.

In late 1982, he read an article from IBM Laboratories, published in Laser Focus, describing the photo-ablative properties of an excimer laser on organic material. This was very exciting information, but, unfortunately, Peyman did not have access to this laser, which at the time was new and very expensive. By 1985 and beyond, many investigators were interested in ablating the corneal surface. However, because of his previous experience with the  laser, Peyman wanted to avoid surface ablation in order to prevent potential corneal scarring and the pain associated with the removal of the corneal epithelium, necessary to expose the surface of the cornea. Therefore, in July 1985, he applied for a patent that described a method of modifying corneal refractive errors using laser ablation under a corneal flap. This US patent was accepted after two revisions and issued in June, 1989. Peyman performed a number of experimental studies evaluating the effect of various excimer lasers in collaboration with Physics Department of the University of Helsinki, Finland. Since he had purchased an Erb-Yag laser in the U.S., he evaluated the concept using this laser in vivo in rabbit and primate eyes and described the creation of a hinged corneal flap to enable the ablation to be performed on the exposed corneal bed, thus reducing the potential for postoperative scarring and pain.

Always aware of the potential limitations of his invention, Peyman devoted considerable time and effort in subsequent years to ameliorating them. In order to improve the risk/benefit considerations of the LASIK procedure, he invented in 2004 and patented a broad range of ablative and non-ablative inlays to be placed under the surgically 
created corneal flap (US Patent 6,702,807). These inlays offered many potential advantages over the standard LASIK technique, the most significant of which is that the inlay procedure is reversible.

However their ablation was not predictable. In October 2009 Peyman invented and applied for a patent on a method of preventing corneal implant rejection, which was approved in 2017 (US Patent 9,681,942).  It consisted of forming a Lasik flap in the cornea, raising the flap, inserting a lamellar cornea under the flap so as to overlie the exposed stromal tissue. The inlay is ablated with wavefront guided excimer laser, to correct the refractive errors of the eye, applying a cross linking solution to the inlay and stromal tissue of the cornea, replacing the corneal flap and cross linking the inlay with UV radiation, killing the cellular elements in the inlay and its surrounding cornea, preventing cellular migration in the inlay and its rejection or encapsulation by the host corneal cells.  This new procedure is now called “Mesoick” (Meso means Inside, Implant, Crosslinking Keratomileusis (US Patent 9,037,033). This creates an immune privileged cell free space that does not initiate an immune response to an implant. A synthetic, crosslinked organic or polymeric lens can be implanted in the corneal pocket to compensate for the patient's refractive error. The implant can be exchanged as the eye grows or refractive need dictates.

Laser in ophthalmology
Peyman has been granted 200 US Patents covering a broad range of novel medical devices, intra-ocular drug delivery, surgical techniques, as well as new methods of diagnosis and treatment.

 First attempt to correct refractive - Modification of rabbit corneal curvature with use of carbon dioxide laser burns (1980)
 Errors using lasers Evaluations of laser use in ophthalmology - Histopathological studies on transscleral argon-krypton laser coagulation with an exolaser probe (1984)
 Comparison of the effects of argon fluoride (ArF) and krypton fluoride (KrF) excimer lasers on ocular structures (1985)
 The Nd:YAG laser 1.3µ wavelength: In vitro effects on ocular structures (1987)
 Effects of an erbium:YAG laser on ocular structures (1987)
 Contact laser: Thermal sclerostomy ab interna (1987)
 Internal trans-pars plana filtering procedure in humans (1988)
 Internal pars plana sclerotomy with the contact Nd:YAG laser: An experimental study (1988)
Intraocular telescope for age related - Age-related macular degeneration and its management (1988)
Endolaser for vitrectomy (Arch Ophthalmol. 1980 Nov;98(11):2062-4)
New operating microscope with stereovision for the operator and his assistant(US Patent 4,138,191)

Development of direct intraocular drug delivery and Vitrectomy
 Refs. Articles; J Ophthalmic Vis Res. 2018 Apr-Jun;13(2):91-92. Doi, Retina. 2009 Jul-Aug;29(7):875-912.  
 Vitreoretinal surgical techniques;  Informa  2007 UK Ltd .

Surgical removal of intraocular tumors
 Can J Ophthalmol. 1988 Aug;23(5):218-23.
 Br J Ophthalmol. 1998 Oct;82(10):1147-53.

Remote controlled system for Laser Surgery 
This technology enables an ophthalmologist to treat a patient located in another location e.g. another city by a laser system controlled remotely, via the internet, using a sophisticated secure system in a non-contact fashion.

Development of precision thermotherapy in oncology
Therapy of malignant tumors in early-stage along with imaging and immune therapy and precision localized drug delivery:

Tele-laser system and tele- medicine with a novel Dynamic Identity recognition 

Macular degeneration

 Retinal pigment epithelium transplantation - A technique for retinal pigment epithelium transplantation for age-related macular degeneration secondary to extensive subfoveal scarring (1991)
 Photodynamic therapy for ARMD - The effect of light-activating .n ethyl etiopurpurin (SnET2) on normal rabbit choriocapillaries (1996)
 Problems with and pitfalls of photodynamic therapy (2000)
 Semiconductor photodiode stimulation - Subretinal semiconductor microphotodiode array (1998)
 Subretinal implantation of semiconductor-based photodiodes. Durability of novel implant designs (2002)
 The artificial silicon retina microchip for the treatment of vision loss from retinitis pigmentosa (2004)
 Testing intravitreal toxicity of Bevacizumab (Avastin), (2006)
 Oscillatory photodynamic therapy for choroidal neovascularization and central serous retinopathy; a pilot study (2013).
8,141,557 Method of oscillatory thermotherapy of biological tissue.

Intravitreal slow-release Rock inhibitors alone or in combination with Anti-VEGF

Artificial Retina Stimulation

Semiconductor photodiode stimulation of the retina  - Subretinal semiconductor microphotodiode array (1998) 
Subretinal implantation of semiconductor-based photodiodes. Durability of novel implant designs (2002)
The artificial silicon retina microchip for the treatment of vision loss from retinitis pigmentosa (2004)

Quantum dots and Optogenetic for artificial retinal and brain stimulation and gene therapy

8,409,263—Methods to regulate polarization of excitable cells 
8,388,668—Methods to regulate polarization of excitable cells 
8,460,351—Methods to regulate polarization and enhance function of excitable cells
8,562,660—Methods to regulate polarization and enhance function of excitable cells

Gene therapy with non-viral nanoparticles and CRISPR
10,022,457—Methods to regulate polarization and enhance function of excitable cells

Adaptic optic phoropter for automated vision correction and Tunable light field camera in use for VR and AR technology

7,993,399—External lens adapted to change refractive properties 
8,409,278—External lens with flexible membranes for automatic correction of the refractive errors of a person
8,603,164—Adjustable fluidic telescope combined with an intraocular lens
9,016,860-Fluidic adaptive optics fundus camera
9,164,206-Variable focal length achromatic lens system comprising a diffractive lens and a refractive lens 
9,191,568-Automated camera system with one or more fluidic lenses
9,671,607-Flexible fluidic mirror and hybrid system 
9,681,800-Holographic adaptive see-through phoropter 
10,133,056-Flexible fluidic mirror and hybrid system

Honors and awards
Among other awards and honors, Peyman has received the National Medal of Technology and Innovation (2012), the Waring Medal of the Journal of Refractive Surgery (2008), and the American Academy of Ophthalmology's Lifetime Achievement Award (2008) He was named a fellow of the National Academy of Inventors in 2013.

References 
 Dr. Peyman's CV (Source: Tulane University)

External links 
 20 YEARS of LASIK
 
 Artificial Silicon Retina
 Tulane Ophthalmology Faculty
 Dr. Gholam Peyman Official Website

American ophthalmologists
Drug delivery devices
American biographers
Living people
Iranian ophthalmologists
American writers of Iranian descent
Iranian expatriate academics
1937 births
Iranian expatriates in the United States